is a train station located in Kurume, Fukuoka, Japan.

Lines
Nishi-Nippon Railroad
Tenjin Ōmuta Line
Amagi Line

Platforms

Adjacent stations

References

Railway stations in Fukuoka Prefecture
Railway stations in Japan opened in 1924